Islam Tarek (born December 2, 1988) is an Egyptian professional footballer who plays as a goalkeeper for Tanta.

References

External links 
 Islam Tarek at KOOORA.com

Living people
1988 births
Egyptian footballers
Association football goalkeepers
Tanta SC players
Egyptian Premier League players